Jean-Pierre Gibrat (born 14 April 1954) is a French comic artist and scriptwriter. His first complete stories were published in the French magazine Pilote.
With Jackie Berroyer, he took on le petit Goudard in 1978, a series which he continued in the same year in Charlie Mensuel, then in Fluide Glacial in 1980.
During this time, some of his artwork was also published in the press : l'Evénement du jeudi, le Nouvel Obs, Sciences et Avenir and he also produced work for Okapi and Je bouquine.
In late 1982, he pencilled La Parisienne in Pilote, again on a script by Berroyer.
In 1985, on Saval's texts, Gibrat drew, in Télé Poche, l'Empire sous la mer, an adventure starring the canine character Zaza, created by Dany Saval and Michel Drucker.

In October 1997, the graphic novel Le sursis was released, followed by volume 2 in September 1999, Le vol du Corbeau in 2002 and its second volume in 2005; all of which were published by Dupuis.

Works 
 With Jackie Berroyer:
 Le Petit Goudard in 1978
 Visions futées in 1980
 C'est bien du Goudard in 1981
 la Parisienne in 1983
 Goudard et la parisienne in 1985
 With Dany Saval
 Les Aventures de Zaza in 1985
 Goudard a de la chance in 1985
 Mission en Afrique in 1988, with Guy Vidal
 Mission en Thaïlande in 1991
 Mission au Guatémala in 1994 with Dominique Leguillier
 Narcisse Mullot in 1994 with Jean-Claude Forest
 Pinocchia in 1995 with Francis Leroi
 Marée basse in 1996 with Daniel Pecqueur
 Le Sursis
 Volume 1, 1997
 Volume 2, 1999
 Le Vol du corbeau:
 Volume 1, 2002
 Volume 2, 2005
 Les Gens Honnêtes volume 1, 2008
 Mattéo:
 Première époque (1914–1915), Futuropolis, 2008 - Official selection of the Festival d'Angoulême, 2009
 Deuxième époque (1917–1918), Futuropolis, 2010
 Troisième époque (Août 1936), Futuropolis, 2014

External links 
  Interview with Jean-Pierre Gibrat at the release of Vol du corbeau

References 

Living people
French comics artists
1954 births
Chevaliers of the Ordre des Arts et des Lettres